Bernardo Atxaga (born 27 July 1951), pseudonym of Joseba Irazu Garmendia, is a Spanish Basque writer and self-translator.

Biography
Atxaga was born in Asteasu, Gipuzkoa, Basque Country, Spain in 1951. He received a diploma in economics from the University of Bilbao, and studied philosophy at the University of Barcelona. He worked as an economist, bookseller, professor of the Basque language, a publisher, and a radio scriptwriter until 1980 when he dedicated himself completely to writing.

His first text was published in 1972 in an anthology of Basque authors. His first short story, Ziutateaz ("About The City"), was published in 1976. His first collection of poetry, Etiopia ("Ethiopia"), appeared in 1978. He has written plays, song lyrics, novels and short stories. His book of short stories, Obabakoak ("Individuals and things of Obaba"), published in 1988 won him much fame and several prizes, such as Spain's National Literature Prize. So far, the book has been translated into more than 20 languages.

Atxaga generally writes in the Basque language, Euskara, but translates his works into Spanish as well. Following the example of Obabakoak, several of his other works have been translated into other languages.

Novels
  (1988) (English language edition, translated by Margaret Jull Costa, published in 1992 by Hutchinson, London)
  ("Memoirs of a Basque Cow", Pamiela, 1991)
  (Pamiela, 1993; "The Lone Man", English version by Margaret Jull Costa, Harvill 1996)
  (1996; "The Lone Woman", English version by Margaret Jull Costa, Harvill, 1999)
  (2003; "The Accordionist's Son", English version by Margaret Jull Costa, Harvill Secker, 2007)
  (2009; "Seven Houses in France", English version by Margaret Jull Costa, Harvill Secker, 2011)
  (2012); "The Fighter", English version by Amaia Gabantxo, Etxepare Basque Institute
  (2014); "Nevada Days", English version by Margaret Jull Costa, published 2018 by Graywolf Press)
  (2019); "Houses and Tombs"

Short stories
  ("Two Brothers", Erein, 1985)
  ( "Two letters", Erein, 1985)
  ("Henry bengoa inventarium. When the Snake looks at the Birds, The Lone Woman", Erein, 1995)
  ("The Man Named Sara", Pamiela, 1996)

Poetry
  ("Ethiopia", Pott, 1978),
  ("New Ethiopia", Detursa, 1997)

Children's books
  ("Chuck Aranberri At a Dentist", Erein, 1985)
  ("Adventures of Nicholas, Ramuntxo Detective", Elkar 1979)
  ("Stories and Songs of Siberia", Erein)
  (Elkar)
  (Erein, 1995),
  ("Xola and the Wild Boars", Erein 1996) - won the Basque Children's Literature Prize en 1997
  ("The World and Markoni", BBK fundazioa, 1995)

Other works
  (1976)
' (2005)

See also
Koldo Izagirre

Bibliography 
 José Ángel Ascunce: Bernardo Atxaga. Los demonios personales de un escritor. Donostia-San Sebastián: Saturraran editorial, 2000. .

External links

 
Biography from the international literature festival berlin
Interview with Bernardo Atxaga in The Guardian (20 October 2001)
 

1951 births
Basque writers
Basque-language poets
Living people
University of Barcelona alumni
Basque-language writers
20th-century Spanish writers
20th-century Spanish male writers
21st-century Spanish writers